Mount Mackenzie is a  mountain just southeast of the city of Revelstoke, British Columbia, Canada.  Part of the Selkirk Mountains, it is the site of the Revelstoke Mountain Resort ski area and was named for the Right Honourable Sir Alexander Mackenzie, the second Prime Minister of Canada.


Climate
Based on the Köppen climate classification, Mount Mackenzie is located in a subarctic climate zone with cold, snowy winters, and mild summers.

See also
Geography of British Columbia

References

Two-thousanders of British Columbia
Selkirk Mountains
Columbia Country
Kootenay Land District